David Jiménez Pinteño known as David DeMaría (born January 20, 1976) is a Spanish singer and songwriter. David was born in Jerez de la Frontera in Cádiz Province, Spain. His career started when he was 14 years old with the Spanish group Kelliam 71. He was with them for 6 years. His first solo album came when he was 19 years old. The self-titled album was followed with Soñar Despierto {Dreaming Awake} in 1997, El Color del Destino {The Color of Destiny} in 2001, Sin Miedo a Perder {Without Fear of Losing} in 2003, and Barcos de Papel {Paper Boats} in 2004. In 2005 an international album simply titled David DeMaria was released which contained some of his more popular hits from his previous albums.

Discography

Albums
 1997 David DeMaria — (SP)
 1997 Soñar Despierto — No. 87 (SP)
 2001 El Color Del Destino — No. 54 (SP)
 2003 Sin Miedo A Perder — No. 1 (SP)
 2004 Barcos De Papel — No. 1 (SP)
 2005 En Concierto: Gira Barcos De Papel — #1 (SP)
 2005 David DeMaria (international release)
 2006 Caminos De Ida y Vuelta — #3 (SP) (Gold: 40,000 units)
 2007 La fuerza de la voluntad: Grandes Éxitos — (CD recopilatorio + 3 temas inéditos)
 2009 Relojes de arena
 2013 Otras vidas — #2 (SP)
 2018 20 Años — #3 (SP)

Singles
 2003 "Cada Vez Que Estoy Sin Ti" — No. 1 (SP)
 2003 "Sin Miedo a Perder" — No. 1 (SP)
 2003 "Petalos Marchitos" — No. 15 (SP)
 2004 "Precisamente Ahora" — No. 1 (SP)
 2004 "Barcos de Papel" — No. 11 (SP)
 2005 "La Ciudad Perdida" — No. 1  (SP)
 2006 "Despertaré Cuando te Vayas" — No. 3 (SP)
 2007 "Caminos de Ida y Vuelta"
 2007 "El Perfume de la Soledad"
 2008 "Dueña de este mar"
 2009 "Que yo no quiero problemas"

References

External links

Official Website
David DeMaría's Official Label Site – Free music online

1976 births
Living people
People from Jerez de la Frontera
Singers from Andalusia
Spanish songwriters
Latin pop singers
21st-century Spanish singers
21st-century Spanish male singers